Orito is a town and municipality in the Putumayo Department, Republic of Colombia. The town is just south of the confluence of the Patascoy and Luzonyaco Rivers.

The town is served by Orito Airport.

Climate
Orito has a tropical rainforest climate (Köppen Af) with heavy to very heavy rainfall year-round.

References

Municipalities of Putumayo Department